Jean I Grimaldi (Giovanni I Grimaldi) (c. 1382 – 1454) was Lord of Monaco three times; 1395, jointly with his brothers Ambroise and Antonie from 1419 to 1436, and he held the title by himself from 1436 until 1454.

Notes

Sources 

1382 births
1454 deaths
14th-century Lords of Monaco
15th-century Lords of Monaco
House of Grimaldi
Lords of Monaco